Wade Oostendorp (born 20 April 1988) is an Australian footballer who plays for Dapto Dandaloo Fury in the Illawarra Premier League.

Club career 
Oostendorp started his career at the Australian Institute of Sport and was soon signed by new A-League club Sydney FC.

He has played for Marconi Stallions and Bonnyrigg White Eagles in the New South Wales Premier League.

He has already represented his country at international level, playing 3 games for the Australian U-17's during the 2005 FIFA U-17 World Championship

References

External links 
 FIFA Profile

1988 births
Sydney FC players
Australian soccer players
A-League Men players
Living people
Bonnyrigg White Eagles FC players
National Premier Leagues players
Association football defenders